Black Comedy is an Australian television sketch comedy program produced by Scarlett Pictures which first screened on ABC on 5 November 2014. Black Comedy combines a mix of observational and physical sketches, historical sketches and parodies of TV, film and commercials, looking at Australian culture through the eyes of Indigenous Australians.

A second series screened in 2016, a third in 2018, and a fourth in 2020.

Cast 
 Jon Bell
 Wayne Blair
 Adam Briggs 
 Aaron Fa'aoso
 Nayuka Gorrie
 Maci-Grace Johnson
 Rarriwuy Hick
 Nakkiah Lui
 Steven Oliver
 Bjorn Stewart 
 Dalara Williams
 Gabriel Willie
 David Woodhead
 Elizabeth Wymarra
 Ian Zaro

Guests 

 Craig Anderson
 Christine Anu
 Jimi Bani
 Katie Beckett
 Luke Carroll
 Jack Charles
 Brendan Cowell
 Matt Day
 Maggie Dence
 Lasarus Ratuere
 Michael Dorman
 Guy Edmonds
 Costa Georgiadis
 Chris Haywood
 Anita Hegh
 Lisa Hensley
 Sacha Horler
 Jay Laga'aia
 Robbie Magasiva
 Deborah Mailman
 Jeff McMullen
 Leah Purcell
 Rupert Reid
 Brooke Satchwell
 Shari Sebbens
 Bruce Spence
 Miranda Tapsell
 Michael Veitch
 Felix Williamson
 Meyne Wyatt

Episodes

Series 1 (2014)

Series 2 (2016)

Series 3 (2018)

Series 4 (2020)

Promotion 
Prior to the premiere of Black Comedy in November, ABC released a sketch, "Race Card Platinum" on the Friday Night Crack Up on 10 October 2014 as part of the ABC's "MentalAs" campaign to raise money and awareness for mental health issues. The sketch was introduced by series writer/actor Elizabeth Wymarra and series actor Aaron Fa'aoso and featured actor, Kyas Sherriff in a mock-advertising campaign for the fictitious "Race Card Platinum".

References

External links 
 
 

2014 Australian television series debuts
Australian Broadcasting Corporation original programming
Australian comedy television series
Australian television sketch shows
Indigenous Australian television series